Babu Rao Mediyam (born 10 July 1951) is an Indian politician. He was a member of the 14th Lok Sabha. He represented the Bhadrachalam (Lok Sabha constituency) constituency of Andhra Pradesh and is a member of the Communist Party of India (Marxist). The Bhadrachalam (Lok Sabha constituency) has been reserved for scheduled tribes.

External links
 Official biographical sketch in Parliament of India website

1951 births
Living people
Communist Party of India (Marxist) politicians from Andhra Pradesh
India MPs 2004–2009
Telugu politicians
Lok Sabha members from Andhra Pradesh
Communist Party of India (Marxist) candidates in the 2014 Indian general election